Arrows may refer to:
 more than one arrow
 Arrows (Australian band), indie rock band established 2006
 Arrows (British band), 1970s Anglo-American glam rock-pop band
 Arrows (Unicode block), a Unicode block containing line, curve, and semicircle symbols terminating in barbs or arrows
 Also in the topic of Unicode:
 Arrows in Unicode
 Miscellaneous Symbols and Arrows (Unicode block)
 Supplemental Arrows-A (Unicode block)
 Supplemental Arrows-B (Unicode block)
 Supplemental Arrows-C (Unicode block)
 "Arrows" (song), 2014 song by Fences featuring Macklemore and produced by Ryan Lewis
 "Arrows" (Foo Fighters song), from the 2017 album Concrete and Gold
 "Arrows", a song by Fireworks from their 2011 album Gospel
 Arrows (Stonegard album), 2006
 Arrows (The Lonely Forest album), 2011
 Arrows (TV series), Arrows pop band's 1976-7 weekly ITV TV series
 Arrows Grand Prix International, defunct Formula One team

See also 
 Arrow (disambiguation)